This listing contains taxa of plants in the division Lycopodiophyta, recorded from South Africa.The lycophytes, when broadly circumscribed, are a vascular plant (tracheophyte) subgroup of the kingdom Plantae. They are sometimes placed in a division Lycopodiophyta or Lycophyta or in a subdivision Lycopodiophytina. They are one of the oldest lineages of extant (living) vascular plants; the group contains extinct plants that have been dated from the Silurian (ca. 425 million years ago). Lycophytes were some of the dominating plant species of the Carboniferous period, and included tree-like species, although extant lycophytes are relatively small plants.

23,420 species of vascular plant have been recorded in South Africa, making it the sixth most species-rich country in the world and the most species-rich country on the African continent. Of these, 153 species are considered to be threatened. Nine biomes have been described in South Africa: Fynbos, Succulent Karoo, desert, Nama Karoo, grassland, savanna, Albany thickets, the Indian Ocean coastal belt, and forests.

The 2018 South African National Biodiversity Institute's National Biodiversity Assessment plant checklist lists 35,130 taxa in the phyla Anthocerotophyta (hornworts (6)), Anthophyta (flowering plants(33534)), Bryophyta (mosses (685)), Cycadophyta (cycads (42)), Lycopodiophyta (Lycophytes(45)), Marchantiophyta (liverworts (376)), Pinophyta (conifers (33)), and Pteridophyta {cryptograms(408)).

Names are given as listed in the source. Where the accepted name at source date differs, it is appended.

Listing
Huperzia dacrydioides (Baker) Pic.Serm. indigenous
Huperzia gnidioides (L.f.) Trevis. indigenous
Huperzia ophioglossoides (Lam.) Rothm. indigenous
Huperzia saururus (Lam.) Trevis. indigenous
Huperzia verticillata (L.f.) Trevis. indigenous
Isoetes aemulans J.P.Roux, indigenous
Isoetes aequinoctialis Welw. ex A.Braun, indigenous
Isoetes capensis A.V.Duthie, endemic
Isoetes capensis A.V.Duthie var. stephanseniae (A.V.Duthie) Schelpe & N.C.Anthony, synonym for Isoetes stephansenii A.V.Duthie
Isoetes eludens J.P.Roux, Hopper & Rhian J.Sm. indigenous
Isoetes labri-draconis N.R.Crouch, indigenous
Isoetes schweinfurthii A.Braun ex Baker, indigenous
Isoetes stellenbossiensis A.V.Duthie, endemic
Isoetes stephansenii A.V.Duthie, endemic
Isoetes toximontana Musselman & J.P.Roux, indigenous
Isoetes transvaalensis Jermy & Schelpe, indigenous
Isoetes welwitschii A.Braun, indigenous
Isoetes wormaldii Sim, endemic
Lycopodiella caroliniana (L.) Pic.Serm. indigenous
Lycopodiella cernua (L.) Pic.Serm. indigenous
Lycopodiella sarcocaulon (A.Braun & Welw. ex Kuhn) Pic.Serm. indigenous
Lycopodium carolinianum L. synonym for Lycopodiella caroliniana (L.) Pic.Serm.
Lycopodium carolinianum L. var. grandifolium Spring, synonym for Lycopodiella sarcocaulon (A.Braun & Welw. ex Kuhn) Pic.Serm.
Lycopodium cernuum L. synonym for Lycopodiella cernua (L.) Pic.Serm.
Lycopodium clavatum L. indigenous
Lycopodium complanatum L. subsp. zanclophyllum (J.H.Wilce) Schelpe, synonym for Lycopodium zanclophyllum J.H.Wilce
Lycopodium dacrydioides Baker, synonym for Huperzia dacrydioides (Baker) Pic.Serm.
Lycopodium gnidioides L.f. synonym for Huperzia gnidioides (L.f.) Trevis.
Lycopodium ophioglossoides Lam. synonym for Huperzia ophioglossoides (Lam.) Rothm.
Lycopodium sarcocaulon A.Braun & Welw. ex Kuhn, synonym for Lycopodiella sarcocaulon (A.Braun & Welw. ex Kuhn) Pic.Serm.
Lycopodium saururus Lam. synonym for Huperzia saururus (Lam.) Trevis.
Lycopodium verticillatum L.f. synonym for Huperzia verticillata (L.f.) Trevis.
Lycopodium zanclophyllum J.H.Wilce, indigenous
Selaginella caffrorum (Milde) Hieron. indigenous
Selaginella caffrorum (Milde) Hieron. var. caffrorum, indigenous
Selaginella culverwellii N.R.Crouch, indigenous
Selaginella dregei (C.Presl) Hieron. indigenous
Selaginella grisea Alston, indigenous
Selaginella imbricata (Forssk.) Spring ex Decne. indigenous
Selaginella kraussiana (Kunze) A.Braun, indigenous
Selaginella mittenii Baker, indigenous
Selaginella nivea Alston, indigenous
Selaginella nivea Alston ex Alston subsp. nivea, indigenous
Selaginella nubigena J.P.Roux, indigenous
Selaginella pygmaea (Kaulf.) Alston, indigenous

See also

References

South African plant biodiversity lists
Lycophytes